Frank William Lock (12 March 1922 – 17 March 1985) was an English footballer and manager who played as a left back in the Football League.

Personal life 
Frank's parents, Mary Ann and Frank William, had 5 children, Dorothy (Doll), Frank, Fred, Richard (George) and Charlie. Most lived in North London - formally known as Middlesex, particularly the Barnet area. His relations are spread across the country including London, Surrey and Cornwall as only currently known. he also had 2 sons Peter and David.

References
https://www.lfchistory.net/Players/Player/Profile/718

External links
 LFChistory.net player profile
Frank Lock's Career

1922 births
1985 deaths
English footballers
Footballers from Whitechapel
Association football defenders
Charlton Athletic F.C. players
Liverpool F.C. players
Watford F.C. players
Cambridge United F.C. players
Finchley F.C. players
English Football League players
F.C. Clacton players
F.C. Clacton managers
English football managers